Gene Therriault (born January 31, 1960) is an American politician who served as a member of the Alaska Senate, representing the Q district from 2001 to 2009. He served as the Senate President from 2003–2006 and as Senate Minority Leader from 2007–2008. Previously he was a member of the Alaska House of Representatives from 1992 through 2000.

References

External links

|-

|-

|-

1960 births
Republican Party Alaska state senators
Living people
Republican Party members of the Alaska House of Representatives
People from North Pole, Alaska
Presidents of the Alaska Senate
21st-century American politicians